Baron Rodolphe d'Erlanger (b. Boulogne-Billancourt, France, June 7, 1872; d. Tunis, October 29, 1932) was a French painter and musicologist, specializing in North African and Arabic music.

Life and artistic career
Rodolphe François Baron d'Erlanger was the fourth son of German-French private banker Baron Frédéric Émile d'Erlanger and his American wife Marguerite Mathilde Slidell (1842–1927), daughter of businessman and politician John Slidell. His eldest brother Raphael Slidell d'Erlanger (1865–1897) was a zoologist and professor at Heidelberg. The second brother was Baron Emile Beaumont d'Erlanger (1866–1939) who took over the bank's management. His third brother Baron Frédéric Alfred d'Erlanger (1868–1943) also became a banker, but acquired acclaim as a composer as well. (See: Erlanger family tree).

Baron Rodolphe d'Erlanger studied in Paris and London. He was married to the Italian countess Maria Elisabetta Barbiellini-Amidei. Their only son, Leo Frédéric Alfred Baron d'Erlanger (1898–1978), eventually became the head of the family-owned bank which however he sold to Philip Hill Higginson Ltd. and its chairing partner Kenneth Keith, later Baron Keith of Castleacre, in 1958. The bank then became Philip Hill Higginson Erlanger Ltd., until a further fusion with M Samuel, then named Hill, Samuel & Co.

Contribution to the study of Arabic music and art
His palace at Sidi Bou Said, in northern Tunisia, which he named Ennejma Ezzahra (sometimes spelled Nejma Ezzohara), was built between 1909 and 1921.

In the early 1930s and under the patronage of King Fuad I of Egypt, he was one of the persons who prepared the first Congress of Arabic Music, that took place in 1932 in Cairo. Although he was too ill to attend and died soon after, he sent an ensemble from Tunisia to perform at the Congress in Cairo.

Apart from his collection of musical instruments, his studies on Arabic or North African music and sound recordings, he helped to revive the Tunisian musical genre known as ma'luf during the 1920s. His lasting contribution to the ethnomusicology of Arabic music, however, was the six-volume "La musique arabe", published in Paris in French and Arabic from 1930 onwards, and re-edited in 2001 with the support of the Institut du Monde Arabe in Paris.

Further reading 
Davis, Ruth (1997). "Traditional Arab Music Ensembles in Tunis: Modernizing Al-Turath in the Shadow of Egypt. Asian Music'', v. 28, no. 2 (Spring/Summer 1997), pp. 73–108.

References

External links

 Paintings by Rodolphe d'Erlanger on artnet
Article from The New York Times
Paintings by Rodolphe d'Erlanger
Painting from the Tate Gallery

1872 births
1932 deaths
Rodolphe
People from Boulogne-Billancourt
Arabic music
French ethnomusicologists
19th-century French musicologists
20th-century French musicologists
Barons of France
19th-century French painters
French people of Jewish descent
French male painters
20th-century French painters
20th-century French male artists
19th-century French male artists